Liao Zhongkai (April 23, 1877 – August 20, 1925) was a Chinese-American Kuomintang leader and financier. He was the principal architect of the first Kuomintang–Chinese Communist Party (KMT–CCP) United Front in the 1920s. He was assassinated in Canton in August 1925.

Early life
Liao was born in 1877 in San Francisco and received his early education in the United States. He was one of twenty-four children. His father Liao Zhubin, who had five wives, was sent to San Francisco by the Hong Kong and Shanghai Bank.
  
Returning to Hong Kong in 1893, at the age of sixteen he studied at Queen's College from 1896. He married He Xiangning in 1897. He then went to Japan in January 1903 to study political science at Waseda University.  In 1907 he went to Chuo University to study  political and economic science.

In politics

Liao joined the Chinese Revolutionary Alliance in 1905 upon its founding and became the director of the financial bureau of Kwangtung after the founding of the Republic of China.

In the early struggles of the party, Liao Zhongkai was arrested by Kwangtung strongman Chen Jiongming in June 1922. After Chen's defeat Liao became Civil governor of Guangdong from  May 1923 to February 1924, and then again from June to September 1924. During the first Kuomintang–Chinese Communist Party cooperation period, he was appointed to the  Kuomintang Executive Committee.

When the KMT was reformed in 1924, he was named the head of the Department of Workers, and then Department of  Peasants. Later he became Minister of Finance of the southern government, seated in Guangdong.  When Sun Yat-sen died in Beijing in March, 1925, and Liao was one of the three most powerful figures in the Kuomintang Executive Committee, the other two were Wang Jingwei and Hu Hanmin.

Liao continued his belief in Sun's policy after Sun died, including one of the key policies of maintaining close relations with the Soviet Union as well as the Chinese Communist Party, which was strongly opposed by the KMT right wing. Liao was assassinated before a Kuomintang Executive Committee meeting on August 20, 1925 in Guangzhou, when five gunmen riddled him with bullets from Mauser C96s as he stepped out of his limousine. Suspicion for the act fell upon Hu Hanmin, who was then arrested. This left only Wang Jingwei and the rising Chiang Kai-shek as rivals for control of the Kuomintang.

Liao and He Xiangning had a daughter, Liao Mengxing, and a son, Liao Chengzhi. The latter had four sons, Liao Hui being the eldest. Anna Chennault is his niece.

References

Further reading 
 Itoh, Mayumi (August 2012). Pioneers of Sino-Japanese Relations: Liao and Takasaki. Palgrave-MacMillan. .

External links

Rulers; Index Li-Ll, Liao Zhongkai biography 
廖仲愷簡介 biography with photo

1877 births
American people of Chinese descent
1925 deaths
Assassinated Chinese politicians
Hakka people
People from Huiyang
Politicians from San Francisco
People murdered in China
Economic Affairs Ministers of the Republic of China
Members of the Kuomintang
Tongmenghui members
Chinese expatriates in Japan
Waseda University alumni
Chuo University alumni
Burials in Nanjing
Alumni of Queen's College, Hong Kong